Castle Creek is a tributary of the North Fork Toutle River on the flank of Mount St. Helens in Washington state. It rises about two miles (three kilometers) northwest of the crater rim and flows generally to the northwest. The outflow of Castle Lake joins the creek at the lake's north end after traveling a few hundred meters on the South Fork Castle Creek.

Castle Lake was created by an avalanche subsequent to the May 18, 1980 eruption of Mount St. Helens which blocked South Fork Castle Creek. Pre-1980 maps show this area as "Castle Creek Marsh".

References

Rivers of Cowlitz County, Washington
Rivers of Skamania County, Washington